Christopher Benfey (born October 28, 1954) is an American literary critic and Emily Dickinson scholar. He is the Mellon Professor of English at Mount Holyoke College.

Early life and education
Benfey was born in Merion, Pennsylvania, but spent most of his childhood in Richmond, Indiana. and attended The Putney School. His father was a German immigrant and his mother was from North Carolina. He began his undergraduate studies at Earlham College, where his father, Otto Theodor Benfey, was a professor in the Chemistry department, and completed his B.A. at Guilford College. Benfey holds a Ph.D. in Comparative Literature from  Harvard University.

Career
Benfey is a specialist in 19th and 20th century American literature. He is also an established essayist and critic who has been published in The Atlantic, The New York Times Sunday Book Review, The New Republic, The New York Review of Books, and The Times Literary Supplement. He was an art critic for Slate.

He is Andrew W. Mellon Professor of English. He is a Guggenheim fellow, as well as a fellow of the National Endowment for the Humanities.

Books
Degas in New Orleans: Encounters in the Creole World of Kate Chopin and George Washington Cable  (1999)
The Great Wave: Gilded Age Misfits, Japanese Eccentrics, and the Opening of Old Japan, (2003)
A Summer of Hummingbirds: Love, Art, and Scandal in the Intersecting Worlds of Emily Dickinson, Mark Twain, Harriet Beecher Stowe, and Martin Johnson Heade (2008)
American Audacity: Literary Essays North and South (2010)
Red Brick, Black Mountain, White Clay (2012)

Notes

External links
 Official website - Mount Holyoke College
Christopher Benfey in the New York Review of Books
The Woman in White Joyce Carol Oates review of Benfey's A Summer of Hummingbirds: Love, Art, and Scandal in the Intersecting Worlds of Emily Dickinson, Mark Twain, Harriet Beecher Stowe, and Martin Johnson Heade
Author page and article archive from The New York Review of Books

1954 births
Living people
American literary critics
Earlham College alumni
Harvard Graduate School of Arts and Sciences alumni
Literary critics of English
Mount Holyoke College faculty
Writers from Richmond, Indiana
Guilford College alumni
Fellows of the American Academy of Arts and Sciences
The Putney School alumni